The First Presbyterian Church Sanctuary Building is a historic church building at 2001 Santa Clara Avenue in Alameda, California. It was built in 1904, and was added to the National Register in 1980.

The building's main sanctuary walls include 14 stained glass windows.  Four of these are decorative; ten depict Christ.

Other buildings on the property, built in 1967, are not included in the nomination.

References

Presbyterian churches in California
Churches on the National Register of Historic Places in California
Renaissance Revival architecture in California
Neoclassical architecture in California
Churches completed in 1904
Churches in Alameda County, California
National Register of Historic Places in Alameda County, California
Neoclassical church buildings in the United States